Rodrigo Pollero López (born 14 September 1996) is a Uruguayan professional footballer who plays as a forward for Swiss Challenge League club Bellinzona.

Career
A youth academy product of Peñarol, Pollero made his professional debut on 10 September 2016 while being on loan at Cerro Largo. He came on as a 59th minute substitute for Walter Cubilla in 3–0 win against Central Español and scored a goal six minutes later.

Swiss club Chiasso announced the signing of Pollero in January 2019. On 8 September 2020, Schaffhausen announced the signing of Pollero along with fellow Uruguayans Emiliano Mozzone and Guillermo Padula. With 19 goals from 32 matches, he finished 2020–21 season as league top scorer.

On 15 July 2021, Zürich announced the signing of Pollero on a season long loan deal with option to buy. On 25 January 2022, he joined Lausanne-Sport on loan until the end of the season.

In July 2022, Pollero joined Bellinzona.

References

External links
 

1996 births
Living people
Uruguayan footballers
Association football forwards
Uruguayan Segunda División players
Uruguayan Primera División players
Argentine Primera División players
Swiss Challenge League players
Swiss Super League players
Cerro Largo F.C. players
Sud América players
Arsenal de Sarandí footballers
FC Chiasso players
FC Schaffhausen players
FC Zürich players
FC Lausanne-Sport players
AC Bellinzona players
Uruguayan expatriate footballers
Uruguayan expatriate sportspeople in Argentina
Uruguayan expatriate sportspeople in Switzerland
Expatriate footballers in Argentina
Expatriate footballers in Switzerland